K161 or K-161 may refer to:

K-161 (Kansas highway), a state highway in Kansas
Kay K-161 ThinTwin, an electric guitar
Symphony, K. 161 (Mozart)